The Al Mualla family is the ruling royal family of Umm Al Quwain, one of the seven emirates that together comprise the United Arab Emirates (UAE).

The family was traditionally at the head of the Al Ali tribe. The Al Ali (singular, Aliyi), were some 6,750 strong at the turn of the 19th century and were almost all settled either at Umm Al Quwain (1,000 families) or the inland town of Falaj Al Ali (later to be known as Falaj Al Mualla). Some 200 settled Al Ali families lived in Sharjah and 150 in Ras Al Khaimah, although there was also a small Bedouin section of some 140 families who roamed a dar between Jazirat Al Hamra and Falaj Al Ali. There was a Persian group of Al Ali, who referred to the Umm Al Quwain section as 'Al Mualla'. The tribe originated in Nejd.

Founding Umm Al Quwain 
The first known head of the Al Ali when they settled at Umm Al Quwain was Sheikh Rashid bin Majid Al Mualla. Sheikh Rashid was responsible for the construction of Umm Al Quwain Fort in the town in 1768, today home to Umm Al Quwain museum.

The fort and its watchtower were built after the Al Ali tribe moved from the island of Sinniyah to the mainland after water supplies on the island were exhausted.

Rulers 
The successive Al Mualla Rulers of Umm Al Quwain were:

 1768–1820: Sheikh Rashid bin Majid Al Mualla
 1820–1853: Sheikh Abdullah bin Rashid Al Mualla
 1853–1873: Sheikh Ali bin Abdullah Al Mualla
 1873–1904: Sheikh Ahmad bin Abdullah Al Mualla (b. 18?? – d. 1904)
 13 June 1904 – 1922: Sheikh Rashid bin Ahmad Al Mualla (b. 1876 – d. 1922)
 1922 – October 1923: Sheikh Abdullah bin Rashid Al Mualla II
 October 1923 – 9 February 1929: Sheikh Hamad bin Ibrahim Al Mualla
 9 February 1929 – 21 February 1981: Sheikh Ahmad bin Rashid Al Mualla (b. 1904 – d. 1981)
 21 February 1981 – 2 January 2009: Sheikh Rashid bin Ahmad Al Mualla II (b. 1932 – d. 2009)
 2 January 2009 – present: Sheikh Saud bin Rashid Al Mualla (b. 1952)

Deputy rulers 
The successive Al Mualla Deputy Rulers of Umm Al Quwain were:

 20 April 2004 – present: Sheikh Abdullah bin Rashid Al Mualla III (b. 1971)

References 

Middle Eastern royal families
Tribes of the United Arab Emirates
Arab dynasties
History of the United Arab Emirates